Yoo Hae-jin (born January 4, 1970) is a South Korean actor. After graduated with a Theater degree from Seoul Institute of the Arts, he became a member of Theater troupe The Mokwha Repertoire Company.

Since 1997 Yoo then began doing bit roles in films, graduating to supporting roles where he acquired a reputation as a scene stealer. Yoo now has become a bonafide marquee name in the box office. He has since established himself as one of the top character actors in the country, notably in King and the Clown, Small Town Rivals, Jeon Woo-chi: The Taoist Wizard, Moss, The Unjust, The Pirates, The Classified File, Minority Opinion, Veteran, and Public Enemy and its sequels.  He starred in high-grossing films; Confidential Assignment, A Taxi Driver and 1987: When the Day Comes. In particular, A Taxi Driver earned him a Best Supporting Actor award at the Korean Association of Film Critics Awards and a nomination at the Asian Film Awards.

Career
As a child, Yoo Hae-jin would often slip in through the backdoor of a cultural center near his home to watch events that were being held there. After seeing a play in eighth grade, the teenager decided on acting as his future career. He begged to be sent to an arts high school, but his family was conservative and not financially capable. So in his junior year in high school, Yoo joined an acting troupe. In the beginning, he ran errands for the other actors and tried to copy what they did from a distance. Though introverted, Yoo slowly began to learn how to act on stage. After applying twice for a Theater and Film course in college and getting rejected because of his looks, Yoo majored in Fashion Design instead. But acting remained his passion and he concentrated on his theater work rather than his fashion subjects, barely graduating. Due to a special selection process for college graduates based solely on their grades, Yoo was finally accepted to the theater department of the Seoul Institute of the Arts.

Yoo then began doing bit roles in films, graduating to supporting roles where he acquired a reputation as a scene stealer. Despite a short screen time, his performances made a strong impression on audiences and critics. As Korean films became more diverse in terms of genre, Yoo found opportunities in increasingly weighty roles, and now has become a bonafide marquee name in the box office. He has since established himself as one of the top character actors in the country, notably in King and the Clown, Small Town Rivals, Jeon Woo-chi: The Taoist Wizard, Moss, The Unjust, The Pirates, The Classified File, Minority Opinion, Veteran, and Public Enemy and its sequels.  
2017 was a successful year for Yoo - he had roles in three high-grossing films; Confidential Assignment, A Taxi Driver and 1987: When the Day Comes. In particular, A Taxi Driver earned him a Best Supporting Actor award at the Korean Association of Film Critics Awards and a nomination at the Asian Film Awards.

Thereafter, Yoo began to take up lead roles. His lead starring film, Luck Key, surpassed 5 million viewers. 
He next starred in family comedy Love+Sling, and Intimate Strangers, a remake of the Italian comedy film Perfect Strangers. In 2018, he was cast in the historical war film Battle.

He has also appeared as a regular cast member in two reality shows: 2 Days & 1 Night from March to November 2013, and Three Meals a Day: Fishing Village in January 2015.

Personal life
Yoo and actress Kim Hye-soo first met in 2001 after shooting the movie Kick the Moon and became close in 2006 after appearing together in Tazza: The High Rollers. Rumors of the two dating surfaced starting 2008 although both continuously denied any romantic involvement until early 2010 when paparazzi photographs of the two were released, and the couple officially confirmed their relationship. Yoo and Kim broke up in 2011.

Filmography

Film

Television

Television show

Music video

Theater

Awards and nominations

Listicles

References

External links
 Yu Hae-jin at Huayi Brothers 

Living people
1970 births
South Korean male television actors
South Korean male film actors
South Korean male stage actors
Seoul Institute of the Arts alumni
People from North Chungcheong Province
20th-century South Korean male actors
21st-century South Korean male actors
Best Supporting Actor Paeksang Arts Award (film) winners